Singersroom is an online music magazine devoted to news, reviews, interviews, music, videos, lifestyle and fashion trends on R&B and urban-pop culture. Owned by MusicLife Entertainment Group, it has an audience of more than 500,000 readers per month.

Awards and nominations 

|-
|2010
|Singersroom
|Soul Train Music Award for Best Soul Site
|
|-
|2011
|Singersroom
|Soul Train Music Award for Best Soul Site
|

References 

Online music magazines published in the United States